Joshua David Bard (born March 30, 1978) is an American former professional baseball catcher. He is the bullpen coach for the Los Angeles Dodgers of Major League Baseball (MLB). He played in MLB as a catcher for the Cleveland Indians, Boston Red Sox, San Diego Padres, Washington Nationals and Seattle Mariners from 2002 to 2011. Bard was a switch-hitter who threw right-handed during his playing career.

Early life and personal
Bard was born in Ithaca, New York. His family moved to Elizabeth, Colorado, when he was an infant. He attended Cherry Creek High School in Greenwood Village, Colorado. He then attended Texas Tech University, where he was a three-time All-American while playing for Texas Tech Red Raiders.

Career

Cleveland Indians
On August 23, 2002, Bard made his MLB debut against the Seattle Mariners and hit a walk-off home run, becoming the second player to accomplish this feat in a debut since Billy Parker. In 2003, Bard posted a .244 average with 8 home runs and 36 RBI in 91 games played.

In 2004, Bard spent the first half of the season on the disabled list due to an abdominal injury, and then spent nearly the rest of the season in the minors. In 2005, Bard returned to the Indians roster, backing up Víctor Martínez.

Boston Red Sox
In January 2006, Bard was acquired by the Boston Red Sox, along with outfielder Coco Crisp and reliever David Riske, for reliever Guillermo Mota, third base prospect Andy Marte, and catcher Kelly Shoppach.  He became the Red Sox's backup catcher during spring training 2006 following the retirement of John Flaherty.

As a member of the Boston Red Sox in April 2006, his primary duties were catching knuckleball pitcher Tim Wakefield. In the beginning of the season, this proved to be a challenging task, as Bard gave up 3 passed balls in his first appearance for the Red Sox on April 5, 2006. In an April 26, 2006, game against the Cleveland Indians, Bard gave up 4 passed balls, giving him a total of 10 passed balls in his first 5 games.

San Diego Padres

A few days later, Bard was traded along with Cla Meredith to the San Diego Padres for Doug Mirabelli. Mirabelli, who had been traded by the Red Sox to the Padres for Mark Loretta during the offseason, was experienced at catching Tim Wakefield.

A lifetime .240 hitter before joining the Padres, Bard hit .338 in 231 at-bats the rest of the season as the backup to Mike Piazza.

Bard was behind the plate on August 4, 2007, for a home game against the San Francisco Giants. He was catching for pitcher Clay Hensley when Hensley gave up Barry Bonds's 755th home run, which tied Bonds with Hank Aaron for most career home runs.

Bard's hot hitting did not continue into the 2008 season. He began the season as the Padres' starting catcher, with Rob Bowen as his backup. In June, Bowen was traded to the Chicago Cubs for catcher Michael Barrett.  In October 2008, Bard left the Padres and became a free agent.

Boston Red Sox
On January 2, 2009, Bard returned to the Red Sox with a one-year, $1.6 million contract, which included a $3 million club option for 2010. However, on March 18, he was released.

Washington Nationals
On March 21, 2009 Bard signed a minor league deal with the Washington Nationals and was invited to Spring Training. He played in 90 games for the Nationals, hitting .230.

Seattle Mariners
On December 28, 2009, Bard signed a minor league contract with the Seattle Mariners.

Bard has his contract purchased by Seattle on June 29, 2011. He played in 26 games with the Mariners, hitting .210. He elected free agency on October 30. On August 13, 2011, he was involved in a controversial play against the Boston Red Sox. Dustin Pedroia hit a fly ball to Ichiro Suzuki, who caught the ball as Jacoby Ellsbury tagged up from third and tried to score. Ichiro, who was known for throwing runners out at home, threw a strike to Bard, who collided with Ellsbury. He held onto the ball and got hurt on the play. Shortly after, he dropped the ball. Ellsbury was initially called safe. Eric Wedge came out to argue. The umpires discussed it and soon called Ellsbury out. Terry Francona was ejected for arguing the call.

Los Angeles Dodgers
He signed a minor league contract with the Los Angeles Dodgers in December 2011. He was released by the Dodgers on March 29, 2012. But later re-signed with them and was assigned to the AAA Albuquerque Isotopes. He was the backup catcher to Tim Federowicz at Albuquerque and appeared in 45 games with a .331 batting average. Bard singled in his final career at bat against the Omaha Storm Chasers in the Isotopes season-ending playoff loss on September 9, 2012.

Coaching
Bard retired after the season and chose to remain with the Dodgers as a Special Assistant. He became the Dodgers major league bullpen coach for the 2016 season.

The New York Yankees hired Bard as their bench coach for the 2018 season under new manager Aaron Boone. Bard served as acting manager on September 2, due to Boone serving a one-game suspension and again the following season on July 19. On November 11, 2019, Bard left his bench coach position in order to find a job closer to his Colorado home and was replaced by infield coach Carlos Mendoza.

On December 9, 2019, the Dodgers announced that Bard would return as their bullpen coach for the 2020 season. Bard won the World Series with the Dodgers in 2020 as their bullpen coach.

Personal life
Although Bard was born in Ithaca, New York, his family moved to Colorado when he was five months old. His wife, Lindsey, is a teacher and they have been married for 10 years. Together they have three children.

Bard's brother Mike is an MLB personal coach, was a collegiate coach for 13 years, and is currently a private instructor in the Denver area at Bardo's Diamond Sports in Parker.

References

External links

   
   

1978 births
Living people
Akron Aeros players
Albuquerque Isotopes players
Arizona League Padres players
Baseball players from New York (state)
Boston Red Sox players
Buffalo Bisons (minor league) players
Carolina Mudcats players
Cleveland Indians players
Colorado Springs Sky Sox players
Lake Elsinore Storm players
Los Angeles Dodgers coaches
Los Angeles Dodgers scouts
Mahoning Valley Scrappers players
Major League Baseball bullpen coaches
Major League Baseball catchers
Sportspeople from Ithaca, New York
Portland Beavers players
Salem Avalanche players
San Diego Padres players
Seattle Mariners players
Syracuse Chiefs players
Tacoma Rainiers players
Texas Tech Red Raiders baseball players
Washington Nationals players
People from Elbert County, Colorado
New York Yankees coaches
All-American college baseball players